The year 682 BC was a year of the pre-Julian Roman calendar. In the Roman Empire, it was known as year 72 Ab urbe condita . The denomination 682 BC for this year has been used since the early medieval period, when the Anno Domini calendar era became the prevalent method in Europe for naming years.

Events

By place

Middle East 
 Urtaki succeeds Shilnak-Inshushinak as the king of Elam.
 This is the last year of the reign of Sennacherib, king of the Neo-Assyrian Empire.

Births

Deaths 

Zhou zhuang wang, King of the Zhou Dynasty of China.

References